The 1993–94 2. Bundesliga season was the twentieth season of the 2. Bundesliga, the second tier of the German football league system. It was the last season the league consisted of twenty clubs as it would operate with eighteen from 1994 to 1995 onwards.

SC Freiburg, Bayer Uerdingen and TSV 1860 Munich were promoted to the Bundesliga while Stuttgarter Kickers, FC Carl Zeiss Jena, Wuppertaler SV, Rot-Weiss Essen and Tennis Borussia Berlin were relegated to the newly introduced Regionalliga.

League table
For the 1993–94 season TSV 1860 Munich, Rot-Weiss Essen and Tennis Borussia Berlin were newly promoted to the 2. Bundesliga from the Oberliga while VfL Bochum, Bayer 05 Uerdingen and 1. FC Saarbrücken had been relegated to the league from the Bundesliga.

Results

Top scorers
The league's top scorers:

References

External links
 2. Bundesliga 1993/1994 at Weltfussball.de 
 1993–94 2. Bundesliga at kicker.de 

1993-94
2
Germany